John Fowler (April 27, 1756 – August 22, 1840) was an American planter and political leader in Virginia and Kentucky. He was a Jeffersonian Democrat who served as a Democratic-Republican member of the United States House of Representatives from Kentucky in the United States Congress from 1797 to 1807. Fowler was also an early settler and civic leader in Lexington, Kentucky.

Early life and education
Fowler was born in Chesterfield County, Virginia, on April 27, 1756, to John and Judith (Hudson) Fowler. He attended the common schools. He fought in the American Revolutionary War, joining Captain Patterson's company in 1777 as a first lieutenant and rising to the rank of captain in 1783. Fowler studied at the College of William & Mary in 1780; he was a member of the Williamsburg Lodge Freemasons.

Career 
In 1783, Fowler moved to Lexington, Kentucky. In October 1786, by act of the Virginia General Assembly, Fowler was appointed to serve as one of the trustees of the new city of Frankfort, Kentucky. In June 1787, Fowler joined Captain James Brown's company of Kentucky volunteers, which fought Indians. In 1787, Fowler was part of the Danville convention of 1787 (Kentucky's third statehood convention), representing Fayette County, then part of Virginia but later part of Kentucky. The same year, Fowler was elected to the Virginia House of Delegates. On 1788, Fowler was Fayette County to the Virginia Ratifying Convention, which ratified the United States Constitution. In 1788, Fowler, along with Richard Clough Anderson Sr. and Green Clay, established Lexington Freemason Lodge No. 1. From 1787 to 1794, Fowler served as an ensign in the Lexington Light Infantry, and fought against Indians. Fowler was a member of Kentucky Society for Promoting Useful Knowledge, which was associated with the Danville Political Club.

Fowler was the treasurer of Transylvania Seminary from 1789 to 1793. He was "gentleman justice" for Woodford County, Kentucky from May 5, 1789 to 1794. From 1792 to 1794, Fowler served as clerk of the court of oyer and terminer, and clerk to the directors of public buildings. In the 1794 elections, Fowler was a candidate for U.S. Senate from Kentucky, but was eliminated on the first ballot in the Kentucky Legislature; Humphrey Marshall received eighteen votes, John Breckinridge sixteen, Fowler eight, and incumbent John Edwards seven.

Fowler was elected to the United States House of Representatives in 1797. He was reelected several times—he served in the Fifth, Sixth, Seventh, Eighth, and Ninth congresses—and served a total of ten years, leaving office in 1807. After leaving office, he served as a member of the board of trustees of Lexington, and chairman of the board from 1817 to 1818. Fowler also served as the fourth postmaster of Lexington, from 1814 to 1822.

Fowler had large land holdings in Virginia and Kentucky. He was one of the founders of the Kentucky Agricultural Society. Sometime before 1800, Fowler established "Fowler's Gardens" on three hundred acres near Lexington. This large tract of land on the eastern edge of Lexington opened as a park in 1817, and the area was used for fairs, picnics, barbeques, political gatherings, and other events.

In 1802, Fowler donated ninety-three acres of land near Carlisle, Kentucky, to the Concord Presbyterian Church.

Personal life 
Fowler married Millicent Wills of Virginia sometime before 1789, and they had five children. Millicent Wills Fowler predeceased him in July 1833. Fowler died in Lexington on August 22, 1840. He is buried in the Old Episcopal Cemetery in Lexington.

References

External links

1756 births
1840 deaths
American Freemasons
American military personnel of the Indian Wars
American planters
College of William & Mary alumni
Delegates to the Virginia Ratifying Convention
18th-century American politicians
Democratic-Republican Party members of the United States House of Representatives from Kentucky
Members of the Virginia House of Delegates
People from Chesterfield County, Virginia
Politicians from Lexington, Kentucky
Virginia militiamen in the American Revolution